The Masbate slender skink (Brachymeles mapalanggaon) is a species of skink endemic to the Philippines.

References

Reptiles of the Philippines
Reptiles described in 2014
Brachymeles